The Ottawa River (Algonquin: Kichi-Sìbì/Kitchissippi) is a river in the Canadian provinces of Ontario and Quebec. It is named after the Algonquin word 'to trade', as it was the major trade route of Eastern Canada at the time. For most of its length, it defines the border between these two provinces. It is a major tributary of the St. Lawrence River and the longest river in Quebec.

Geography

The river rises at Lac des Outaouais, north of the Laurentian Mountains of central Quebec, and flows west to Lake Timiskaming. From there its route has been used to define the interprovincial border with Ontario. 

From Lake Timiskaming, the river flows southeast to Ottawa and Gatineau, where it tumbles over Chaudière Falls and further takes in the Rideau and Gatineau rivers.

The Ottawa River drains into the Lake of Two Mountains and the St. Lawrence River at Montreal.

The river flows through large areas of deciduous and coniferous forest formed over thousands of years as trees recolonized the Ottawa Valley after the ice age. Generally, the coniferous forests and blueberry bogs occur on old sand plains left by retreating glaciers, or in wetter areas with clay substrate. The deciduous forests, dominated by birch, maple, beech, oak and ash occur in more mesic areas with better soil, generally around the boundary with the La Varendrye Park. These primeval forests were occasionally affected by natural fire, mostly started by lightning, which led to increased reproduction by pine and oak, as well as fire barrens and their associated species.  The vast areas of pine were exploited by early loggers. Later generations of logging removed hemlock for use in tanning leather, leaving a permanent deficit of hemlock in most forests. Associated with the logging and early settlement were vast wild fires which not only removed the forests, but led to soil erosion. Consequently, nearly all the forests show varying degrees of human disturbance. Tracts of older forest are uncommon, and hence they are considered of considerable importance for conservation.

The Ottawa River has large areas of wetlands.  Some of the more biologically important wetland areas include (going downstream from Pembroke), the Westmeath sand dune/wetland complex, Mississippi Snye, Breckenridge Nature Reserve, Shirleys Bay, Ottawa Beach/Andrew Haydon Park, Petrie Island, the Duck Islands and Greens Creek.  The Westmeath sand dune/wetland complex is significant for its relatively pristine sand dunes, few of which remain along the Ottawa River, and the many associated rare plants. Shirleys Bay has a biologically diverse shoreline alvar, as well as one of the largest silver maple swamps along the river.  Like all wetlands, these depend upon the seasonal fluctuations in the water level.  High water levels help create and maintain silver maple swamps, while low water periods allow many rare wetland plants to grow on the emerged sand and clay flats.  There are five principal wetland vegetation types.  One is swamp, mostly silver maple.  There are four herbaceous vegetation types, named for the dominant plant species in them: Scirpus, Eleocharis, Sparganium and Typha.  Which type occurs in a particular location depends upon factors such as substrate type, water depth, ice-scour and fertility. Inland, and mostly south of the river, older river channels, which date back to the end of the ice age, and no longer have flowing water, have sometimes filled with a different wetland type, peat bog.  Examples include Mer Bleue and Alfred Bog.

Major tributaries include:

 Bonnechere River
 Coulonge River
 Dumoine River
 Gatineau River
 Kipawa River
 du Lièvre River
 Madawaska River
 Mattawa River
 Mississippi River
 Montreal River
 Rivière du Nord
 Noire River
 Petawawa River
 Rideau River
 Rouge River
 South Nation River

Communities along the Ottawa River include (in down-stream order):

Kitcisakik Anicinape Community
Long Point First Nation
Moffet, Quebec
Laverlochère-Angliers, Quebec
Notre-Dame-du-Nord, Quebec
Temiskaming Shores, Ontario
Ville-Marie, Quebec
Témiscaming, Quebec
Thorne, Ontario
Mattawa, Ontario
Deux Rivières, Ontario
Rapides-des-Joachims, Quebec
Laurentian Hills, Ontario
Deep River, Ontario
Sheenboro, Quebec
Petawawa, Ontario
Pembroke, Ontario
Westmeath, Ontario
Waltham, Quebec
Fort-Coulonge, Quebec
La Passe, Ontario
Campbell's Bay, Quebec
Portage-du-Fort, Quebec
Bristol, Quebec
McNab/Braeside, Ontario
Arnprior, Ontario
Quyon, Quebec
Ottawa, Ontario
Gatineau, Quebec
Masson-Angers, Quebec
Clarence-Rockland, Ontario
Thurso, Quebec
Plaisance, Quebec
Papineauville, Quebec
Montebello, Quebec
Fassett, Quebec
L'Orignal, Ontario
Grenville, Quebec
Hawkesbury, Ontario
Carillon, Quebec
Saint-André-Est, Quebec
Rigaud, Quebec
Saint-Placide, Quebec
Kanesatake
Hudson, Quebec
Oka, Quebec
Vaudreuil-sur-le-Lac, Quebec
Vaudreuil-Dorion, Quebec
Pincourt, Quebec
Norway Bay, Quebec
Pointe-des-Cascades, Quebec

Islands

Ontario

 Alexandra Island
 Aylmer Island
 Basil Island
 Bate Island
 Beacon Island 
 Beckett Island
 Bell Island
 Big Island
 Big Elbow Island
 Bruyère Island
 Burnt Island
Butternut Island
 Carl Island 
 Cedar Island
 Chapman Island 
 Chartrand Island
 Chenaux Island
Christie Island 
 Clarence Island
 Coreille Island
 Corinne Island 
 Cornelius Island 
 Cotnam Island
Crab Islands 
 Cunningam Island
 Cushing Island
Daisy Island 
 Davis Island
 Deep River Islet
 Demers Island 
 Dow Island 
 Dunlop Island 
 Dupras Island
Dutch Island
 Ellis Island 
 Evelyn Island 
 Farr Island
 Fish Island
 Fraser Island 
 Fury Island 
 Gibraltar Island 
 Green Island 
Gutzman Island
 Hamilton Island
 Haycock Island
 Hazel Island 
 Hazelton Island
 Hen Island
 Hog Island
 Houston Island 
 Île Chénier
 Île du Chenail
 Île Ste-Rosalie
 Irving Island 
 Jamieson Island 
John Joe Island 
 Kate Island 
 Kedey's Island
 King Edward Island
 Latour Island 
 Lemieux Island 
 Lillian Island 
 Lorne Island
 Louise Island 
 Lower Duck Island
 Mackie Island 
 Man Island
 Meadow Island
 Merrill Island 
Metcalf Island 
 Miller Island 
 Morris Island
 Oak Island 
 O'Meara Island 
 Parker Island 
 Pearl Island 
 Petrie Island
 Pink Island 
 Poker Island 
 Princess Island
 Ramsey Island
 Randolph Island 
 Rempnouix Island 
 Riopelle Island
 Rocher Capitaine Island
 Ruby Islet 
 Sack's Island
 Sandbar Island
 Santa Island
 Sawlog Island
 Shoal Island 
 Short Turn Island 
 Steamer Island
Snake Island 
 Sullivan Island
 Upper Duck Island
 Victoria Island
 Wabewawa Island 
 Willson Island
Windsor Island

Quebec

L'Île
Île Allen
Île aux Allumettes
Île Armstrong
Île Avelle
Bald Rock
Île Béique
Îles Benny
Île Bernard
Île Bernardin
Île Berry
Île à Bertrand
Île Boom
Île Bray
Île Brisseau
Île Brunet
Île Bryson
Île Cadieux
Île Cobb
Île de Carillon
Île du Centre
Île du Chef
Île du Chenal Blind
Île du Chicot
Îles à Cole
Île du Collège
Île de la Compagnie
Île à Cowley
Île à Crépault
Île D'Arcy
Île Davidson
Île Dog
Île Dubé
Île à Everill
Île Fer à Cheval
Île du Finlandais
Îles Finlay
Île Fitzpatrick
Île au Foin
Île Fox (Pontiac)
Île Fox (Témiscamingue)
Île French
Île Frigon
Île Gagnon
Rocher à Gillis
Rochers aux Goélands
Île Graham
Île du Grand Calumet
Île Green
Île Greene
Île à Griffin
Île Harbec
Île Hemlock
Île Henry
Île Hiam
Île Jacey
Île John-Park
Île Jones
Îles Jumelles
Île Kettle
Île Lafleur
Île Lafontaine
Île Lasalle
Île à Lawn
Île Leblanc
Île Lemoine
Île Leroux
Île Lighthouse (L'Isle-aux-Allumettes)
Île Lighthouse (Bristol)
Île Limerick
Petite île Limerick
Île Lorelei
Île Mann
Île Marcotte
Île à Marion
Île Mohr
Île Morrison
Île Mulligan
Île O'Connor
Île Oscar-Béchamp
Île Oster
Île Paquin
Île à Payne
Îles Pelley
Île Philemon
Île Pigs
Île aux Pins
Île des Quinze
Île Rainville
Île des Rapides
Île du Refuge
Île Reid (Clarendon)
Île Reid (L'Isle-aux-Allumettes)
Île Rita
Île à Ritté
Île du Rocher Fendu
Île à Rouleau
Île à Roussin
Île de Sable
Petite île Sèche
La Semelle
Île Smith
Île Snake
Île des Soeurs
Île Soulier
Île Squelette
Île Submergée
Île Sunset
Île Todd
Île à Tom
Île à Tom-Simon
Île aux Tourtes
Île Verte
Île Victoria
Île Wickens
Île Winneway
Île Woods
Île Wight
Île Young (Pontiac)
Île Young (Gatineau)
Île Yvette-Naubert

Geology

The Ottawa River lies in the Ottawa-Bonnechere Graben, which is a Mesozoic rift valley that formed 175 million years ago. Much of the river flows through the Canadian Shield, although lower areas flow through limestone plains and glacial deposits.

As the glacial ice sheet began to retreat at the end of the last ice age, the Ottawa River valley, which, along with the St. Lawrence River valley and Lake Champlain, had been depressed to below sea level by the glacier's weight, filled with sea water.  The resulting arm of the ocean is known as the Champlain Sea.  Fossil remains of marine life dating 12 to 10 thousand years ago have been found in marine clay throughout the region. Sand deposits from this era have produced vast plains, often dominated by pine forests, as well as localized areas of sand dunes, such as Westmeath and Constance Bay.  Clay deposits from this period have resulted in areas of poor drainage, large swamps, and peat bogs in some ancient channels of this river. Hence, the distribution of forests and wetlands is very much a product of these past glacial events.

Large deposits of a material commonly known as Leda clay also formed.  These deposits become highly unstable after heavy rains. Numerous landslides have occurred as a result.  The former site of the town of Lemieux, Ontario collapsed into the South Nation River in 1993.  The town's residents had previously been relocated because of the suspected instability of the earth in that location.

As the land gradually rose again the sea coast retreated and the fresh water courses of today took shape.  Following the demise of the Champlain Sea the Ottawa River  Valley continued to drain the waters of the emerging Upper Great Lakes basin through Lake Nipissing and the Mattawa River. Owing to the ongoing uplift of the land, the eastward flow became blocked around 4000 years ago. Thereafter Lake Nipissing drained westward, through the French River which later became a link in the historic canoe route to the West.

History 

As it does to this day, the river played a vital role in life of the Algonquin people, who lived throughout its watershed at contact.  The river is called Kichisìpi, meaning "Great River" in Anicinàbemowin, the Algonquin language. The Algonquin define themselves in terms of their position on the river, referring to themselves as the Omàmiwinini, 'down-river people'.  Although a majority of the Algonquin First Nation lives in Quebec, the entire Ottawa Valley is Algonquin traditional territory.  Present settlement is a result of adaptations made as a result of settler pressures.

Some early European explorers, possibly considering the Ottawa River to be more significant than the Upper St. Lawrence River, applied the name River Canada to the Ottawa River and the St. Lawrence River below the confluence at Montreal. As the extent of the Great Lakes became clear and the river began to be regarded as a tributary, it was variously known as the Grand River, "Great River" or Grand River of the Algonquins before the present name was settled upon. This name change resulted from the Ottawa peoples' control of the river circa 1685. However, only one band of Ottawa, the Kinouncherpirini or Keinouch, ever inhabited the Ottawa Valley.

In 1615, Samuel de Champlain and Étienne Brûlé, assisted by Algonquin guides, were the first Europeans to travel up the Ottawa River and follow the water route west along the Mattawa and French Rivers to the Great Lakes. See Canadian Canoe Routes (early). For the following two centuries, this route was used by French fur traders, voyageurs and coureurs des bois to Canada's interior. The river posed serious hazards to these travellers. The section near Deux Rivières used to have spectacular and wild rapids, namely the Rapide de la Veillée, the Trou, the Rapide des Deux Rivières, and the Rapide de la Roche Capitaine. (These rapids are now submerged under the reservoir of Holden Lake.) In 1800, explorer Daniel Harmon reported 14 crosses marking the deaths of voyageurs who had drowned in the dangerous waters along this section of the Ottawa.

The main trading posts along the river were: Lachine, Fort Coulonge, Lac des Allumettes, Mattawa House, where west-bound canoes left the river and Fort Témiscamingue. From Lake Timiskaming a portage led north to the Abitibi River and James Bay.

In the early 19th century, the Ottawa River and its tributaries were used to gain access to large virgin forests of white pine. A booming trade in timber developed, and large rafts of logs were floated down the river. A scattering of small subsistence farming communities developed along the shores of the river to provide manpower for the lumber camps in winter. In 1832, following the War of 1812, the Ottawa River gained strategic importance when the Carillon Canal was completed. Together with the Rideau Canal, the Carillon Canal was constructed to provide an alternate military supply route to Kingston and Lake Ontario, bypassing the route along the Saint Lawrence River.

In 1907, the Department of Public Works published a map proposing a shipping lane through the Georgian Bay Ship Canal route, which would connect Georgian Bay to the Ottawa River through Lake Nipissing and the Mattawa River.

Power generation
A pulp and paper mill (at Témiscaming) and several hydroelectric dams have been constructed on the river. In 1950, the dam at Rapides-des-Joachims, was built, forming Holden Lake behind it and thereby submerging the rapids and portages at Deux Rivières. These hydro dams have had negative effects upon shoreline and wetland ecosystems, and are thought to also be responsible for the near extermination of American eels, which were once an abundant species in the river, but which are now uncommon.  As an economic route, its importance was eclipsed by railroad and highways in the 20th century. It is no longer used for log driving, however, it is still extensively used for recreational boating. Some 20,000 pleasure boaters visit the Carillon Canal annually.

Today, Outaouais Herald Emeritus at the Canadian Heraldic Authority is named after the river.

Hydroelectric installations 

Hydroelectric installations on the Upper Ottawa (in downstream order):

Lower Ottawa (in downstream order):

* Ontario Power Generation operates generators 2, 3, 4, and 5 with a capacity of 96 MW; and Hydro-Québec operates generators 6, 7, 8, and 9 with a capacity of 89 MW.

See also

Lac Deschênes
List of Ontario rivers
List of crossings of the Ottawa River
List of islands of Ontario#Ottawa River
List of longest rivers of Canada
Southern Ontario
Eastern Ontario
List of Quebec rivers
Rivière des Mille Îles
Rivière des Prairies

References

External links

 Ottawa-Gatineau Watershed Atlas (OGWA)
 Ottawa River Regulation Planning Board
 Ottawa Riverkeeper
 The Ottawa River
 Algonkin History

 
Rivers of Ottawa
Landforms of Gatineau
Rivers of Montérégie
Rivers of Outaouais
Borders of Quebec
Borders of Ontario